Gudrun Maersk is a container ship, capable of carrying 8,500 TEU and with a deadweight (DWT) of 115,700 metric tons. The ship was built in 2005 and is operated by the Maersk Line.

Design 
The container vessel Gudrun Maersk was constructed at the Odense Steel shipyard in Denmark and launched in 2005. At the time it was the world's largest container vessel, a title it lost in 2006 to the Emma Maersk. The Gudrun Maersk has a capacity of 8,500 TEU.
The vessel's deadweight is 115,700 metric tons with a gross tonnage of 97,933.
The maximum power of the Sulzer 12RT-flex96C low-speed common rail main engine of Gudrun Maersk is 68,640 kW (93,211 bhp)at 102 rpm.
Gudrun and her 5 sister ships use exhaust heat recovery and cogeneration, producing 6 MWe and reducing the need for diesel generators.

See also 
 Emma Maersk
 Hannover Bridge
 NYK Vega

References

External links
Maersk Line

Container ships
Merchant ships of Panama
Ships of the Maersk Line
2005 ships